The Scottish Football Association (also known as the Scottish FA and the SFA; ; Scottish Gaelic: Comann Ball-coise na h-Alba) is the governing body of football in Scotland and has the ultimate responsibility for the control and development of football in Scotland. Members of the SFA include clubs in Scotland, affiliated national associations as well as local associations. It was formed in 1873, making it the second oldest national football association in the world. It is not to be confused with the Scottish Football Union, which is the name that the SRU was known by until the 1920s.

The Scottish Football Association, along with FIFA and the other British governing bodies, sits on the International Football Association Board which is responsible for the laws of the game. The SFA is also a member of FIFA and founder member of UEFA. It is based at Hampden Park in Glasgow. In addition, the Scottish Football Museum is located there.

The Scottish Football Association is responsible for the operation of the Scotland national football team, the annual Scottish Cup and several other duties important to the functioning of the game in Scotland.

History

Following the formation of Scotland's earliest football clubs in the 1860s, football experienced a rapid growth but there was no formal structure, and matches were often arranged in a haphazard and irregular fashion.

Queen's Park, a Glasgow club founded in 1867, took the lead, and following an advertisement in a Glasgow newspaper in 1873, representatives from seven clubs – Queen's Park, Clydesdale, Vale of Leven, Dumbreck, Third Lanark, Eastern and Granville – attended a meeting on 13 March 1873. Furthermore, Kilmarnock sent a letter stating their willingness to join.

That day, these eight clubs formed the Scottish Football Association, and resolved that:

Chief executive/Secretary
The chief executive of the Scottish Football Association oversees the development of football in Scotland and the administration of disciplinary matters, and is also responsible for the general organisation of the national side. One of the most prominent roles of the chief executive is to hire and dismiss Scotland national football team managers.

 Archibald Rae (1873–1874)
 J.C. Mackay (1874–1875)
 William Dick (1875–1880)
 James Fleming (1880–1882)
 Robert Livingstone (1882)
 John McDowall (1882–1928)
 Sir George Graham (1928–1957)
 Willie Allan (1957–1977)
 Ernie Walker CBE (1977–1990) 
 Jim Farry (1990–1999)
 David Taylor (1999–2007)
 Gordon Smith (2007–2010)
 Stewart Regan (2010–2018)
 Ian Maxwell (2018–present)

National teams

As well as the Scotland national football team, the Scottish Football Association is also currently responsible for organising the Scotland B national football team, as well as men's national teams at under-21, under-19, under-18 and under-17 levels. There was also a semi-professional team, but this was disbanded in 2008. In women's football, there is the full Scotland women's national football team, under-19 and under-17 teams.
In Futsal there is a full national side.

Club competitions
The Scottish Football Association organises the Scottish Cup and the Scottish Youth Cup. Although the SFA are not involved in the day-to-day operation of the Scottish Professional Football League or other league competitions, they do appoint referees to officiate the games in these leagues, as well as dealing with player registrations and disciplinary issues.

Club licensing
The Scottish Football Association encourages quality of governance in football clubs through a system of club licence awards. All SFA member clubs are assessed annually in four areas (ground, first team, youth team, and governance) and, if appropriate, awarded a licence at platinum, gold, silver, bronze or entry level. As of June 2021, only Celtic have been awarded a platinum-level licence, while three clubs have been awarded gold-level licences: Hibernian, St Johnstone and St Mirren. All clubs in the Scottish Professional Football League, Highland Football League, and Lowland Football League are required to be licensed at entry level or above.

Member clubs

As of June 2022, 122 clubs are full members of the Scottish Football Association, comprising:

 All 42 clubs in the Scottish Professional Football League
 All 18 clubs in the Highland Football League
 All 16 clubs in the Lowland Football League
 2 clubs in the Midlands Football League:
Lochee United and Tayport
 2 clubs in the North Caledonian League:
Fort William and Golspie Sutherland
 26 clubs in the East of Scotland Football League: 
Blackburn United, Broxburn Athletic, Burntisland Shipyard, Camelon Juniors, Coldstream, Dalkeith Thistle, Dunbar United, Dundonald Bluebell, Dunipace, Easthouses Lily Miners Welfare, Haddington Athletic, Hawick Royal Albert, Hill of Beath Hawthorn, Jeanfield Swifts, Linlithgow Rose, Lothian Thistle Hutchison Vale, Musselburgh Athletic, Newtongrange Star, Penicuik Athletic, Preston Athletic, Sauchie Juniors, St Andrews United, Syngenta, Tranent Juniors, Tynecastle, and Whitehill Welfare
 3 clubs in the South of Scotland Football League: 
Newton Stewart, St Cuthbert Wanderers, and Wigtown & Bladnoch
 13 clubs in the West of Scotland Football League:
Auchinleck Talbot, Benburb, Bonnyton Thistle, Clydebank, Cumnock Juniors, Darvel, Girvan, Glasgow University, Irvine Meadow XI, Kilwinning Rangers, Pollok, Rutherglen Glencairn, and Threave Rovers

Affiliated associations

National associations

The Scottish Football Association has affiliated to it the following seven national associations:

 Scottish Amateur Football Association
 Scottish Junior Football Association
Scottish Para Football Association
 Scottish Schools Football Association
 Scottish Welfare Football Association
 Scottish Women's Football
Scottish Youth Football Association

Local associations

There are 10 local associations affiliated and the competitions they manage are also listed below:

 Aberdeenshire and District Football Association
Aberdeenshire Cup
Aberdeenshire Shield
Aberdeenshire League
 East of Scotland Football Association
East of Scotland Cup
East of Scotland Shield
King Cup
East of Scotland Qualifying Cup
Alex Jack Cup
 Fife Football Association
Fife Cup
 Forfarshire Football Association
Forfarshire FA Challegnge Cup
 Glasgow Football Association
The City of Glasgow Cup
 North of Scotland Football Association
North of Scotland Cup
North of Scotland FA U20 League

 Southern Counties Football Association
Alba Cup
Southern Counties FA Challenge Cup
J Haig Gordon Memorial Trophy
Potts Cup
East, South and West of Scotland Cup Winners Shield
South Region Challenge Cup
 Stirlingshire Football Association
Stirlingshire Cup
 West of Scotland Football Association
Renfrewshire Cup
Renfrewshire Victoria Cup
Wigtownshire & District Football Association
Cree Lodge Cup
Tweedie Cup
 5 North Caledonian Football Association competitions also registered:
 North Caledonian League
 Ness Cup
 North Caledonian Cup
 Football Times Cup
 Jock Mackay Cup

Recognised leagues 
The following six leagues with their affiliated leagues and cups are recognised by The Scottish Football Association:

 Scottish Professional Football League
 Scottish League Cup
 Scottish Challenge Cup
 Scottish Highland Football League
 Highland League Cup
 SHFL U17 League
 Scottish Lowland Football League
 Lowland League Cup
 Lowlands Development League
 Lowlands Development League Cup
Lowlands Development Challenge Cup
 Lowlands Development Knock Out Cup
 East of Scotland Football League
 East of Scotland Football League Cup
 West of Scotland Football League
 West of Scotland Football League Cup
Strathclyde Cup
 South of Scotland Football League
 South of Scotland Football League Cup

References

External links

 
 FIFA profile
 UEFA profile

 
1
Scotland
Sports organizations established in 1873
1873 establishments in Scotland
Organisations based in Glasgow